was a Japanese actress.

Film career
Tokyo-born Akemi Negishi came to the attention of international audiences when she starred in the US/Japanese co-production Anatahan, her debut film. Josef von Sternberg directed the tale of shipwrecked Japanese soldiers who refused to believe that World War II had ended six years after the bombing of Hiroshima.

Negishi made several films with the acclaimed Japanese film director Akira Kurosawa, including Donzoko (The Lower Depths), Dodesukaden, and Ikimono no kiroku (I Live in Fear). Negishi also had a supporting role in Shurayukihime (Lady Snowblood), which was reportedly one of the main inspirations for Quentin Tarantino's film Kill Bill. Other credits included Tokyo no kyujitsu (Tokyo Holiday), Half Human: The Story of the Abominable Snowman (aka Half Human, with John Carradine), King Kong vs. Godzilla and Kaidan hebi-onna (Snake Woman's Curse). Her last film role was in Barameraba in 2005.

Death
She died from ovarian cancer, aged 73, in Kawasaki, Japan in 2008.

Partial filmography 

 Anatahan (1953) - Keiko Kusakabe, the 'Queen Bee'
 Akasen kichi (1953) - Yukiko
 Saraba Rabauru (1954) - Kimu
 Mako osorubeshi (1954)
 Jû jin yuki otoko (1955) - Chika, villager
 Asunaro monogatari (1955) - Yukie
 I Live in Fear (1955) - Asako Kuribayashi
 Shūu (1956) - Hinako
 Ankokugai (1956) - Natsue
 Kon'yaku sanbagarasu (1956)
 Tsuma no kokoro (1956) - Sumiko
 Arashi no naka no otoko (1957) - Okon
 A Rainbow Plays in My Heart (1957) - Atsuko Shimada
 The Lower Depths (1957) - Osen the Prostitute
 Song for a Bride (1958)
 A Holiday in Tokyo (1958) - Ballet Dancer
 Half Human: The Story of the Abominable Snowman (1959) - The Mountain Girl
 Happiness of Us Alone (1961)
 King Kong vs Godzilla (1962) - Chikiro's Mother (Dancing Girl)
 Arashi wo yobu jûhachinin (1963) - Hisako Murata
 Bôsu o tosê (1963)
 Zûzûshii yatsu (1964) - Kiriko
 Zoku zûzûshii yatsu (1964) - Kiriko
 Zoku kôkô san'nensei (1964) - Yasuko Hanai
 Nemuri Kyôshirô: Joyôken (1964) - Seiga the Medium / Kunoichi
 Red Beard (1965) - Okuni, the mistress
 Ore ni tsuite koi! (1965)
 Buraikan jingi (1965) - Tokuko Kumagai
 Kigeki: Kyûkô ressha (1967)
 Ârappoi no ha gômen dazê (1967)
 Kaidan hebi-onna (1968) - Masae Ônuma, Landlord's Wife
 Kemeko no uta (1968) - Fumi
 Maruhi joshidaisei: Ninshin chûzetsu (1969)
 Denki kurage (1970) - Tomi, Yumi's mother
 Onna-tarashi no teiô (1970) - Cecile Hanada
 Shibire Kurage (1970) - Keiko
 Dodes'ka-den (1970) - Good-Looking Housewife
 Asobi (1971) - Boy's mother
 Joshû 701-gô: Sasori (1972) - Otsuka
 Onna ikitemasu: Sakariba wataridori (1972) - Harue
 Sex & Fury (1973) - Ogin Shitateya
 Yasagure anego den: Sôkatsu rinchi (1973) - Osada
 Lady Snowblood (1973) - Tajire no Okiku
 Female Prisoner Scorpion: 701's Grudge Song (1973) - Prison guard Minamimura
 Jyûgun ianfu (1974) - Kura
 Hatsukoi (1975) - Michiko Matsumiya
 Kamome-yo, kirameku umi o mitaka/meguri ai (1975)
 Ai to makoto: Kanketsu-hen (1976)
 The Life of Chikuzan (1977) - Tami
 Kiken na kankei (1978) - Masae Miyakawa
 Orion no satsui yori - Joji no houteishiki (1978) - The mother
 Motto shinayaka ni, motto shitataka ni (1979)
 Kôsatsu (1979) - Hatsuko
 Mo hozue wa tsukanai (1979) - Mariko,s mother
 Hadaka no taisho horo-ki: Yamashita Kiyoshi monogatari (1981)
 Enrai (1981) - Mother of Hirotsugu
 Karuizawa fujin (1982) - Yôko / Keiko's niece
 Chichi to ko (1983) - Yoshie Kudo
 Sasameyuki (1983) - Mrs. Shimozuma
 Location (1984) - Umeko
 Shikibu monogatari (1990) - Fuji
 Rakuyô (1992) - Yamashita's wife

External links
 

1934 births
2008 deaths
Deaths from cancer in Japan
Deaths from ovarian cancer
Japanese film actresses
Actresses from Tokyo